Jack Morris Rains (born November 23, 1937) is a Houston, Texas, attorney who was the 95th Secretary of State of Texas, having served from 1987 to 1989. He left the position to contest unsuccessfully for the Republican gubernatorial nomination in 1990. He lost to businessman Clayton W. Williams, Jr., of Midland, who was then narrowly defeated in the general election by the Democrat Ann Willis Richards, then the state treasurer. Other candidates in the field with Rains and Williams were Kent Hance, a former congressman and previously a Democrat, and Tom Luce, a Dallas lawyer.

Biography
In 1960, Rains earned a Bachelor of Business Administration degree from Texas A&M University, and named a "Distinguished Alumnus", in 1987.  He earned his Doctor of Jurisprudence degree in 1967 from the University of Houston, College of Law, and named a "Distinguished Alumnus" of the University and an "Outstanding Graduate" of the College of Law.

References

Secretaries of State of Texas
Living people
People from Waco, Texas
People from Houston
1937 births
Texas Republicans
Texas lawyers
Texas A&M University alumni
University of Houston alumni